Otto Solymosi (born 20 February 1927) is a director of Magyar Rádió (MR). Solymosi graduated from the Academy of Dramatic and Cinematic Art and started his career at the Royal Revue Theatre in 1948. Since 1954 he has been a director of MR, and in 1974 he became a member of the National Television's director's staff. He is a member of the National Association of Hungarian Journalists.

Solymosi, who received a well merited Jászai Mari Award in 1974, was named Chief Director of Magyar Rádió in 1983.

Selected works

Theatre
 Fényes-Kertész: Csacsifogat;
 Kodály:Háry János;
 Kálmán:Csárdáskirálynő;
 Vaszary-Solymosi:Ki a harmadik?;

Radio
 Molnár:A Pál utcai fiúk;
 Móricz:Rokonok;
 Vadnai-Solymosi:Aki felütötte a telefonkönyvet;

For television Solymosi directed "50 Years of Hungarian Radio" in 1975. He continues to work for radio and the stage, and has organized and produced many shows in North America for Hungarian communities in Toronto, Montreal, New York, and Washington D.C.

Otto Solymosi has a son, Andras Solymosi, a grandchild, Andrea, and seven honorary grandchildren, Virág, Kende, Csillag,  Tündér, Kincső, Kevin and Dominick.

References

External links
 Hungarian Theatre Encyclopedia - Solymosi Ottó 
 Film History Online 
 Mesesziget - Eotvos Lorand University Radio 
 Bástyasétány 77 - Radnóti Theatre 
 A sokaság fia 

1927 births
Hungarian radio people
Mass media people from Budapest
Possibly living people